Ulrich Kaden (born 9 March 1959 in Munich) is a former East German amateur boxer, best known for winning the European title 1987 and 1989 at super heavyweight.

Career
Kaden was 1980 to 1988 nine times champion of East Germany. In 1981 he lost in the European semi finals in Tampere to Francesco Damiani. In 1983 he beat Aleksandr Miroshnichenko but lost in the finals again to Damiani. In 1987 he beat Lennox Lewis in a tournament in Belgrade but Lewis KOd him in the first round of their quarter final bout at the Olympics the next year.

During his career Kaden beat Teófilo Stevenson three times but lost to him six times.

References

External links
Euro 1987
Euro 1989

1959 births
Living people
Sportspeople from Munich
Super-heavyweight boxers
Heavyweight boxers
Olympic boxers of East Germany
Boxers at the 1988 Summer Olympics
German male boxers